Asma Ghanem or Asma Ghanem Miller (born 1991 in Damascus, Syria) is a Palestinian visual artist and experimental musician. She is best known for her documentary film Wall Piano.

Life and career
Asma Ghanem was born in Damascus (Syria) and raised in a refugee camp with her family. Ghanem graduated from the International Academy of Art Palestine - IAAP (Ramallah, Palestine) and she received the  Master of Fine Arts (MFA) from the ISDAT or École des beaux-arts de Toulouse (France).

Ghanem started her career working on an experimental music project called Shams Asma (شمس أسمى). About this, she says:

In 2014, she produced her first experimental album titled Fi Alard (في الأرض).

In 2015, her Photography received special mention in the Palest’In & Out festival, a festival to promote talented young Palestinian artists that it held in Paris (France) and organized by Institut Culturel Franco-Palestinien.

In 2016, her experimental music project called HOMELAND IS… won the 3rd Prize in the Young Artist Award (YAYA) of the Hassan Hourani Award.

In 2021, her documentary film Wall Piano was selected at the Tampere Film Festival (Tampereen elokuvajuhlat), a short film festival held at Finland. In this festival, it received the special mention and the Audience Award.

She currently lives in Ramallah (Palestine).

Awards
 2015: Special mention in the Palest’In & Out festival;
 2016: 3rd Prize in the Young Artist Award (YAYA) of the Hassan Hourani Award (HOMELAND IS… - an experimental music project).
 2021: Special mention and the Audience Award of the Tampere Film Festival (Wall Piano - a short film).

Filmography

References

External links

Living people
1991 births
Palestinian film directors
Palestinian artists
Palestinian musicians
People from Damascus